Jocelyn Kenza Borgella (born August 26, 1971) is a former American football cornerback in the National Football League (NFL) for the Detroit Lions.  He played college football at the Cincinnati. Borgella is the first player of Haitian descent to be drafted and play a game in the NFL.

References

1971 births
Living people
Sportspeople from Nassau, Bahamas
American football cornerbacks
Detroit Lions players
Bahamian players of American football
Washington Redskins players
Scottish Claymores players
American sportspeople of Haitian descent
Cincinnati Bearcats football players